The 1958 Caen Grand Prix was a motor race, run to Formula One rules, held on 20 July 1958 at the Circuit de la Prairie, Caen. The race was run over 86 laps of the circuit, and was won by British driver Stirling Moss who lapped the field in a Cooper T45.

Classification

References

 Results at www.silhouet.com 

Caen Grand Prix
Caen Grand Prix
Caen Grand Prix